The reactive mind is a concept in the Scientology religion formulated by L. Ron Hubbard, referring to that portion of the human mind that is unconscious and operates on stimulus-response, to which Hubbard attributed most mental, emotional, and psychosomatic ailments:

What can it do? It can give a man arthritis, bursitis, asthma, allergies, sinusitis, coronary trouble, high blood pressure and so on, down the whole catalog of psychosomatic ills, adding a few more which were never specifically classified as psychosomatic, such as the common cold.
 — L. Ron Hubbard (Dianetics: The Modern Science of Mental Health, 1999 paperback edition, p. 69)

Despite the lack of scientific basis for his claims, Hubbard's book Dianetics: The Modern Science of Mental Health claimed that the reactive mind is composed of impressions of past events of pain and unconsciousness, which he called engrams.

In Scientology, an auditor uses an E-meter (a galvanic skin response detector) to locate engrams in the parishioner which are then erased, using Dianetics. Scientology promotes such treatments to clear engrams believed to limit the individual's spiritual ability, to halt the decline of his spiritual awareness, and to increase his survival potential.

From the end of the 1950s until the early 1970s, author William S. Burroughs used Hubbard's reactive mind theory as the basis of his cut-up method, which was applied to novels such as The Soft Machine.

Criticism
University of Oxford biology professor Richard Dawkins wrote that Scientology purports to use scientific tools such as its controversial E-meter to augment the "gullibility" of this already "gullible age".

Notes

See also

 Dual process theory
 Schema_(psychology)

External links
 
 

Scientology beliefs and practices